"By Your Side" is a song by Scottish DJ and producer Calvin Harris featuring English singer Tom Grennan, released on 4 June 2021 via Sony Music.

Background
On 4 June 2021, Grennan shared a video on Twitter, captioning it "this is going to be the summer we've all been waiting for."

In an interview with Apple Music 1's Zane Lowe, Harris said: "The first thing is I liked Grennan's voice a lot. I started following him on Instagram. And I was struck by his positivity, his relentless positivity in his posts... So when I figured out what the song was going to sound like, he seemed like such an obvious choice."

Composition
Harris described the song as "nostalgic", and said: "In a nice way. The sort of thing that nobody else is making it, so that feels good. And regardless of how it does or whatever, it felt really nice to me."

Reception
Ellie Mullins of website We Rave You described "By Your Side" as the most essential summer anthem for 2021, writing that "Grennan's influence is heard and not just through the vocals either but also through the fun, upbeat guitars that can be found throughout" and "Harris is on top form with upbeat productions and synths that beg to be danced along to".

Music video
The music video was directed by Emil Nava and released on 11 June 2021. It was described by Jason Heffler of EDM.com as "kaleidoscopic" and a "bubbly audiovisual project that ties in perfectly with the sun-kissed tune".

Charts

Weekly charts

Year-end charts

Certifications

Release history

References

2021 singles
2021 songs
Calvin Harris songs
Songs written by Calvin Harris
Songs written by Jamie Scott
Songs written by John Newman (singer)
Songs written by Mike Needle
Songs written by Theo Hutchcraft
Songs written by Tom Grennan
Sony Music singles
Tom Grennan songs